Kouřim is a town in Kolín District in the Central Bohemian Region of the Czech Republic. It has about 1,900 inhabitants. The town centre is well preserved and is protected by law as an urban monument zone.

Administrative parts
The village of Molitorov is an administrative part of Kouřim.

Geography
It lies in a flat agricultural landscape of the Central Elbe Table.

History

The first written mention of Kouřim is in a deed of Ottokar II of Bohemia from 1261. The royal town of Kouřim was probably founded by Wenceslaus I between 1223 and 1250. At the turn of the 15th and 16th centuries, the town experienced an unprecedented prosperity, and at the end of the 16th century there were over 2,000 inhabitants (which is more than today).

A great disaster for the town was the Thirty Years' War, which ended Kouřim's status as one of the most important towns in the Czech Kingdom. The population declined by 75% and it lost the town privileges until 1740, when it was renewed by Emperor Charles VI.

In 1881, the railway to Pečky was built. At the end of the 19th century, Kouřim was with about 3,000 inhabitants at its peak. In the 20th century, especially at the end of the 1960s, the town stagnated and has become a periphery. It completely lost its cultural identity, originally determined by an extremely strong historical tradition. Thanks to this, however, the town has preserved its "genius loci", which has become an advantage for tourism and filmmaking.

Demographics

Sights
Stará Kouřim ("Old Kouřim") are remains of a gord of the Slavník dynasty on a hill east of town. It dates from the 9th–10th century. An educational trail leads through the remains of the gord. Archaeological finds from the site are on display in the Kouřim Museum.

The Church of Saint Stephen dates from the second half of the 13th century. It is a prominent example of early Gothic architecture.

Town walls in Kouřim dates from the 13th–16th century. In addition to a large part of the walls, one of the four original gates, called the Prague Gate, has been preserved. It is considered to be the best preserved early Gothic town gate in the Czech Republic.

Open-air Museum Kouřim shows various regional types of vernacular architecture from the 17th to the 19th century. The museum is administered by the Regional Museum in Kolín.

In popular culture
Kouřim is a popular place for Czech filmmakers. The films shot here include Patrimony, Hastrman or Nesmrtelná teta.

Notable people
František Vejdovský (1849–1939), zoologist
Evžen Linhart (1898–1949), architect and designer

References

External links

Cities and towns in the Czech Republic
Populated places in Kolín District